Dobandi is a village of Haripur District in Khyber-Pakhtunkhwa, Pakistan, it is located at 34°2'0N 72°56'0E with an altitude of 490 metres (1610 feet).

References

Populated places in Haripur District

Qila Abdullah District